Severn is an unincorporated community in Gloucester County, Virginia, United States. Severn has a post office with ZIP code 23155.

References

Unincorporated communities in Gloucester County, Virginia
Unincorporated communities in Virginia